Kyle Sonnenburg (born May 7, 1986) is a Canadian-German professional ice hockey Defenseman. He is currently playing for the Schwenninger Wild Wings of the German top flight Deutsche Eishockey Liga (DEL).

Playing career 
Sonnenburg played for OHL teams Belleville Bulls and Brampton Battalion before enrolling at the University of Waterloo in 2007. He was named the 2011 Waterloo Male Athlete of the Year and won 2010 and 2011 OUA West Defenceman of the Year honors and was also selected to the CIS All-Canada Second Team during his collegiate career.

In 2011, he represented Team Canada at the World University Games in Erzurum, Turkey, winning bronze.

He first signed with Krefeld Pinguine of the German top flight Deutsche Eishockey Liga (DEL) in 2011 and spent six years with the club. He left Krefeld at the conclusion of the 2016–17 campaign and agreed to terms with fellow DEL side Schwenninger Wild Wings.

At the conclusion of the 2018–19 season, Sonnenburg left the Wild Wings at the completion of his contract. He came back to the team in September 2019.

Personal life 
His parents emigrated from Germany to Canada. Kyle received German citizenship in September 2011.

His cousin Riley also played ice hockey at the University of Waterloo.

References

External links 

1986 births
Canadian ice hockey defencemen
Löwen Frankfurt players
Ice hockey people from Ontario
Living people
Krefeld Pinguine players
Sportspeople from Waterloo, Ontario
University of Waterloo alumni
Schwenninger Wild Wings players
Universiade medalists in ice hockey
Canadian expatriate ice hockey players in Germany
Universiade bronze medalists for Canada
Competitors at the 2011 Winter Universiade